Henri Evrot (born 6 June 1901; date of death unknown) was a French bobsledder who competed in the late 1940s. He won a bronze medal in the four-man event at the 1947 FIBT World Championships in St. Moritz.

Evrot also finished 11th in the two-man event as well as 13th in the four-man event at the 1948 Winter Olympics in St. Moritz.

References
1948 bobsleigh two-man results
Bobsleigh four-man world championship medalists since 1930

1901 births
Year of death missing
French male bobsledders
Olympic bobsledders of France
Bobsledders at the 1948 Winter Olympics